Kate Kelly or Katherine Kelly (1882–1964) was an American sculptor and printmaker.  She was born in California, the daughter of suffragette Hester Lambert Harland.  Kate first visited Hawaii with her mother in 1898, at age 16.   She studied at the Partington Art School in San Francisco, where she met the painter and printmaker John Melville Kelly, whom she married in 1908.  After living in San Francisco, the couple went to Hawaii in 1923.  Their plan was to stay a year, while John worked for an advertising agency creating material to promote tourism.  They fell in love with the islands and the people and stayed permanently.  The Kellys immediately identified with the native Hawaiians and became their champions in images and in print.  Kate took a class in printmaking at the University of Hawaii with Huc-Mazelet Luquiens (1881–1961), and then taught her husband John the techniques of printmaking.  Because of failing vision, Kate gave-up her own career in the mid-1930s and devoted herself to promoting that of her husband.

Kelly's sculptures in public places include:
 Hawaiian Head, Joseph “Red” Kaua , bronze bust, ca. 1930s, John Dominis and Patches Damon Holt Gallery, Honolulu Museum of Art
 Kaipo, Sketch of a Hawaiian Chinese Boy , bronze bust, 1933, John Dominis and Patches Damon Holt Gallery, Honolulu Museum of Art
 Bas-relief of King Kalākaua, old Bethel Street Police Station, Honolulu
 Amelia Earhart plaque, Diamond Head Lookout, Honolulu

References
 Drucker, Natasha Roessler, John Melville Kelly: Hawaiian Idyll, Honolulu Academy of Arts, 2009, 6–7, .
 Severson, Don R. Finding Paradise: Island Art in Private Collections, University of Hawaii Press, 2002, pp. 147–8, 210–11.

Footnotes

External links
 Smithsonian American Art Museum, Art Inventories Catalog

American women sculptors
1882 births
1964 deaths
Sculptors from Hawaii
20th-century American sculptors
20th-century American women artists